William Lorenzo Bertrand (November 15, 1886 – February 29, 1924) was a Canadian professional ice hockey player. He played with the Montreal Canadiens of the National Hockey Association in the 1910–11 and 1913–14 seasons, playing one game in each season.

References

External links
Lorenzo Bertrand at JustSportsStats

1886 births
1924 deaths
Canadian ice hockey right wingers
Ice hockey people from Gatineau
Montreal Canadiens (NHA) players